The 2006 NCAA Division II men's basketball tournament involved 64 schools playing in a single-elimination tournament to determine the national champion of men's NCAA Division II college basketball as the culmination of the 2004–05 NCAA Division II men's basketball season. It was won by Winona State University and WSU's John Smith was the Most Outstanding Player.

Regionals

South - Cleveland, Mississippi 
Location: Walter Sillers Coliseum Host: Delta State University
{{8TeamBracket 
| RD1         = First roundRound of 64March 11
| RD2         = Regional semifinalRound of 32March 12
| RD3         = Regional FinalSweet 16March 14
| RD1-seed1= 1
| RD1-team1= Delta State
| RD1-seed2= 8
| RD1-team2= Stillman
| RD1-score1= 76
| RD1-score2= 70
| RD1-seed3= 4
| RD1-team3= Arkansas–Monticello
| RD1-seed4= 5
| RD1-team4= North Alabama
| RD1-score3= 90
| RD1-score4= 81
| RD1-seed5= 6
| RD1-team5= Rollins
| RD1-seed6= 3
| RD1-team6= Alabama–Huntsville| RD1-score5= 63| RD1-score6= 58
| RD1-seed7= 2
| RD1-team7= Montevallo| RD1-seed8= 7
| RD1-team8= Benedict
| RD1-score7= 69| RD1-score8= 59
| RD2-seed1= 1
| RD2-team1= Delta State
| RD2-seed2= 4
| RD2-team2= Arkansas-Monticello| RD2-score1= 68
| RD2-score2= 83| RD2-seed3= 6
| RD2-team3= Rollins
| RD2-seed4= 2
| RD2-team4= Montevallo| RD2-score3= 68
| RD2-score4= 81| RD3-seed1= 4
| RD3-team1= Arkansas-Monticello
| RD3-seed2= 2
| RD3-team2= Montevallo (OT) 
| RD3-score1= 86
| RD3-score2= 89}}
 West - Seattle, Washington Location: Royal Brougham Pavilion Host: Seattle Pacific University

 Great Lakes - Rensselaer, Indiana Location: Richard F. Scharf Alumni Fieldhouse Host: St. Joseph's College

 South Atlantic - Richmond, Virginia Location: Barco-Stevens Hall Host: Virginia Union University

 North Central - Winona, Minnesota Location: McCown Gymnasium Host: Winona State University

 East - Wilson, North Carolina Location: Wilson Gym Host: Barton College

 Northeast - North Easton, Massachusetts Location: Merkert Gymnasium Host: Stonehill College

 South Central - Bolivar, Missouri Location: Meyer Wellness & Sports Center Host: Southwest Baptist University

Elite Eight–Springfield, MassachusettsLocation: MassMutual Center Hosts:''' American International College and Naismith Memorial Basketball Hall of Fame

All-tournament team
 Tony Binetti (Seattle Pacific)
 Brad Byerson (Virginia Union)
 Darius Hargrove (Virginia Union)
 John Smith (Winona State)
 David Zellmann (Winona State)

References
 2006 NCAA Division II men's basketball tournament jonfmorse.com

NCAA Division II men's basketball tournament
Tournament
NCAA Division II basketball tournament
NCAA Division II basketball tournament